Mereka Kembali (They Return, 1972) is an Indonesian war film directed by Nawi Ismail. The film portrays the Indonesian equivalent of the Chinese Long March, interpreting the past from the perspective of its own time.

References

Sources
 

Indonesian war films
1972 films
1972 war films